Rogovo is a rural locality (a selo) in Pochepsky District, Bryansk Oblast, Russia. In the 19th century the village was part of Kotlyakovskaya volost, Mglinsky Uyezd, Chernigov Governorate. The population was 272 as of 2010. There are 9 streets.

Geography 
Rogovo is located 12 km southwest of Pochep (the district's administrative centre) by road. Bobrovnik is the nearest rural locality.

References 

Rural localities in Pochepsky District